GC-Wiki is an internal wiki run by the United Kingdom's Government Communications Headquarters (GCHQ). It is the UK's equivalent to the NSA's NSANet. The GC-Wiki is generally classified above top secret. Members of the United States Intelligence Community have access to GC-Wiki.

See also
Intellipedia

References

Enterprise wikis
MediaWiki websites
GCHQ